Hendriksdal is a small village and railway stop in the forested mountains of Thaba Chweu Local Municipality of Mpumalanga province, South Africa.

References

Populated places in the Thaba Chweu Local Municipality